Bruno Guimarães Pinho de Azevedo (born 11 March 1986), known as Guima, is a Portuguese former professional footballer who played as a striker.

Club career

Portugal
Guima was born in Santa Maria da Feira, Aveiro District. After finishing his development at C.D. Feirense he started his senior career in amateur football with Associação Desportiva Valecambrense, then returned to his previous team to play one and a half seasons in the Segunda Liga. He finished the 2007–08 campaign on loan to F.C. Pampilhosa in the third division.

Guima then spent two years in the lower leagues, returning to division two in summer 2010 after signing for U.D. Oliveirense. He scored nine goals in his second year, helping the side to the sixth position.

Žilina
On 7 July 2012, Guima signed a two-year deal with MŠK Žilina in Slovakia. He was released by the club on 4 January of the following year, returning to Oliveirense shortly after.

Later years
After two full seasons in the Romanian Liga I with CFR Cluj, free agent Guima joined Primeira Liga club Feirense in September 2016. He made his debut in the competition on 4 December, coming on as a second-half substitute in a 0–2 home loss against F.C. Arouca.

Guima left the Estádio Marcolino de Castro in January 2017 by mutual consent, after only three competitive appearances to his credit.

References

External links

1986 births
Living people
Sportspeople from Santa Maria da Feira
Portuguese footballers
Association football forwards
Primeira Liga players
Liga Portugal 2 players
Segunda Divisão players
C.D. Feirense players
FC Pampilhosa players
Académico de Viseu F.C. players
U.D. Oliveirense players
Slovak Super Liga players
MŠK Žilina players
Liga I players
CFR Cluj players
Portuguese expatriate footballers
Expatriate footballers in Slovakia
Expatriate footballers in Romania
Portuguese expatriate sportspeople in Slovakia
Portuguese expatriate sportspeople in Romania